Runcorn Glacier is a glacier to the west of Hess Mountains in Antarctica. It flows southeast to join Beaumont Glacier near the head of Hilton Inlet, Black Coast, Palmer Land.

The glacier was mapped by United States Geological Survey (USGS) from aerial photographs taken by the U.S. Navy during 1966–69, and surveyed by British Antarctic Survey during 1972–73.

In association with the names of continental drift scientists grouped in this area, the Advisory Committee on Antarctic Names named the glacier after Keith Runcorn in 1998. Runcorn was an English geophysicist whose paleomagnetic reconstruction of the relative motions of Europe and America revived the theory of continental drift and was a major contribution to plate tectonics.

Glaciers of Palmer Land